Gobo is a commune in Mayo-Danay Department, Cameroon. In 2005, the population was recorded at 53119.

See also
Communes of Cameroon

References

Populated places in Far North Region (Cameroon)
Communes of Cameroon